Ivar (Iwar) Aminoff (2 December 1868 — 15 August 1931) was a Finnish lawyer and politician. He was the Minister of Defence for 82 days in the spring of 1924, from 11 March to 31 May 1924. He worked as a lawyer in Turku from 1892 to 1916. He served as secretary of the county of Turku and Pori County and was the acting governor in 1918. He also served on the Turku City Council 1904–1912 and was its vice-president in 1908. He had also owned the manor Tenala in Lemu from 1900.

References

1868 births
1931 deaths
Politicians from Turku
People from Turku and Pori Province (Grand Duchy of Finland)
Finnish people of Russian descent
Ministers of Defence of Finland
19th-century Finnish lawyers
Finnish city councillors

Ivar
19th-century Finnish politicians
20th-century Finnish lawyers